A partial solar eclipse occurred on January 4, 1639 during winter in Asia's Siberia in the Samoyed lands.  A solar eclipse occurs when the Moon passes between Earth and the Sun, thereby totally or partly obscuring the image of the Sun for a viewer on Earth. A partial solar eclipse occurs in the polar regions of the Earth when the center of the Moon's shadow misses the Earth.  

This event marked the beginning of Solar Saros 145.

As is shown under 0.1% obscuration, the center of the Moon's shadow was missed by about 2,826 km above the area (64 N) south of the Arctic Circle.

Description
It was the first eclipse of solar saros 145 with the moon's penumbra touching the earth for just under 8 minutes, sometimes, it was called a micro-eclipse.  The greatest eclipse was in the land of the Samoyeds at 64.6 N and 80 E at 4:56  UTC (9:56 AM local time) at the fourth minute.  All of the eclipse occurred at or after sunrise. Another mini-eclipse occurred on April 16, 1512, 127 years earlier.

It was the first of three partial eclipses that took place that year, the last occurred in the Southern Hemisphere on December 5, 1638, the next was on June 1.

It was the last solar eclipse that took place to date that was under the magnitude of 0.001.  The next short solar eclipse was on January 5, 1935 in the Southern Hemisphere and the magnitude above 0.001.

The solar eclipse was the shortest of the 17th century.

See also 
 List of solar eclipses in the 17th century

References

External links 
 Google interactive maps
 Solar eclipse data

1639 01
1639 in science
1639 1 4
January events